Ruhovtsi (in Bulgarian: Руховци) is a village in northern Bulgaria, Elena municipality, Veliko Tarnovo Province. 

Villages in Veliko Tarnovo Province